Nemanja Mihajlović (born 19 January 1996) is a Serbian professional footballer who plays as a winger for Sloga Meridian.

Club career

Rad
Mihajlović debuted for Rad's first team on 3 April 2013, in a Serbian SuperLiga match versus Donji Srem Pećinci. On 16 August 2014, he scored the equalizer and first goal for Rad in a 2–1 home win over Borac Čačak. In the winter of 2014, it was revealed Mihajlović was scouted by Saint-Étienne. However, Rad declined the €1.2 million offer. On 28 February 2015, Mihajlović scored a winning goal against Borac Čačak. After the end of the 2014–15 season, Serbian sports portal Mozzart Sport rated Mihajlović among the 25 best players in the SuperLiga that season.

On 1 August 2015, Mihajlović scored from long range in what was his first goal of the 2015–16 season in a 4–1 away victory over Radnik Surdulica. On 12 August 2015, against Mladost Lučani, at the start of the second half, he scored from the penalty-spot. He scored his second goal in 4–2 home victory. Rad were losing at half-time and after the turnaround in the second half, Rad went on to win with Mihajlović scoring two goals and providing one assist. During the 2015–16 season, he played 7 matches in the Serbian SuperLiga, scored three goals and provided two assists.

Partizan
On 28 December 2015, Mihajlović signed for Partizan on a three-year contract. On 21 February, he made his official debut for the club against OFK Beograd. On 2 March, he scored his first official goal for Partizan in Serbian Cup Quarter final against Radnički Niš in a 2–0 home win. His first goal for Partizan in 2015–16 Serbian SuperLiga came on 6 April against Javor Ivanjica in a 1–2 away win and helped Partizan to achieve five wins in a row in the championship of Serbia after a year and a half ago. On 3 May 2016, Mihajlović scored a brace in a 4–0 away league win over Radnik Surdulica.

Heerenveen
On 28 July 2017, Mihajlović signed a four-year contract with Eredivisie club Heerenveen, choosing to wear jersey number 15. The transfer fee is believed to be around €1.7 million. He scored his first goal for Heerenveen on his debut, in a 1–1 draw with Heracles on 19 August 2017.

Arka Gdynia
On 17 January 2020, Mihajlović signed a contract for the rest of the season with Polish Ekstraklasa club Arka Gdynia.

Spartak Subotica
On 2 September 2021, he signed with Spartak Subotica for a term of two-and-a-half years.

International career
Mihajlović has played for the Serbian national under-17 team and Serbian national under-18 team.

Mihajlović received his first call-up for the Serbian national under-21 team by manager Tomislav Sivić in March 2016. On 25 March 2016, he played his first match for Serbia U21s, against Andorra at Estadi Comunal in Andorra la Vella, playing in the starting eleven in a 0–4 away win in a 2017 UEFA European Under-21 Championship qualifier.

After a great 2015–16 season with Partizan in the Serbian SuperLiga, Slavoljub Muslin called him up to the senior Serbian national team for several friendly matches in 2016.

Career statistics

Club

Honours

Club
Partizan
 Serbian SuperLiga: 2016–17
 Serbian Cup (2): 2015–16, 2016–17

Individual
 Serbian SuperLiga Team of the Season: 2015–16
 Serbian SuperLiga top assists: 2015–16

References

External links
 Nemanja Mihajlović stats at utakmica.rs 
 
 
 
 

1996 births
Living people
Footballers from Belgrade
Association football forwards
Serbian footballers
Serbian expatriate footballers
Serbia youth international footballers
Serbia under-21 international footballers
FK Rad players
FK Teleoptik players
FK Partizan players
SC Heerenveen players
Arka Gdynia players
Boluspor footballers
Balıkesirspor footballers
FK Spartak Subotica players
Serbian SuperLiga players
Eredivisie players
Ekstraklasa players
TFF First League players
Expatriate footballers in the Netherlands
Expatriate footballers in Poland
Expatriate footballers in Turkey
Expatriate footballers in Bosnia and Herzegovina
Serbian expatriate sportspeople in the Netherlands
Serbian expatriate sportspeople in Poland
Serbian expatriate sportspeople in Turkey
Serbian expatriate sportspeople in Bosnia and Herzegovina